Henry Chichester Hart MRIA FLS (1847–1908) was an Anglo-Irish botanist and explorer.

Early life
He was the son of Sir Andrew Searle Hart and his wife Frances MacDougall, daughter of Henry MacDougall, Q.C., of Dublin. He was educated at Trinity College, Dublin, with a B.A. in experimental and natural science.

Botany and exploration
From the age of 17, Hart conducted a botanical survey of Donegal (lasting until 1898), which led to his publication Flora of the County Donegal, widely regarded as his most important botanical work. The publication was destroyed during a fire as part of the 1916 Easter Rising.

Hart, accompanied by Sir Frederick Cullinan, walked from Terenure to Lugnaquilla, in the Wicklow Mountains - a total of 75 miles - and back in 24 hours, making a record at the time. Hart left Terenure at 10:58 pm on 20 June 1886 and arrived back at 10:48 pm the next evening. The success of this challenge is remembered by the commemorative Hart Walk.

In 1875–1876, Hart accompanied Sir George Strong Nares as a naturalist on his British Arctic Expedition. He was also a naturalist on the Palestine Exploration Fund's 1883-1884 expedition to Palestine.

Personal life
In 1887, he married Edith Susan Anna Donelly (1852-1901), daughter of William Donnely, C.B., L.L.D, of Dublin. They had two daughters and divorced in 1897.

Hart was also interested in Elizabethan literature and he edited numerous Shakespeare plays for the Arden Shakespeare and many works by Ben Jonson for Methuen's Standard Library.

He lived at Carrablagh House, Portsalon, County Donegal. He was High Sheriff of Donegal in 1895.

Publications
 On the botany of the British polar expedition of 1875–1876, (1880).
 On the botany of Sinai and South Palestine, (1885).
 Flora of Howth, (Hodges, Figgis, 1887).
 The animals mentioned in the Bible, (Religious Tract Society, 1888).
 Flora of the County Donegal, (Sealy, Bryers and Walker ; 1898).

References

1847 births
1908 deaths
British explorers
Explorers of the Arctic
British polar explorers
High Sheriffs of Donegal
Irish explorers
19th-century Irish botanists
20th-century Irish botanists
19th-century Anglo-Irish people
Alumni of Trinity College Dublin